Per Mathias Jespersen (29 March 1888 – 13 July 1964) was a Norwegian gymnast who competed in the 1906 Intercalated Games and in the 1908 Summer Olympics. He was born in Skien. He was married to Anna Johnsen, and they were the parents of Finn Varde Jespersen.

At the 1906 Intercalated Games in Athens, he was a member of the Norwegian gymnastics team, which won the gold medal in the team, Swedish system event.

Two years later he won the silver medal as part of the Norwegian team in the gymnastics team event.

He died in Oslo.

References

External links
 
 

1888 births
1964 deaths
Norwegian male artistic gymnasts
Olympic gymnasts of Norway
Olympic gold medalists for Norway
Olympic silver medalists for Norway
Olympic medalists in gymnastics
Medalists at the 1906 Intercalated Games
Medalists at the 1908 Summer Olympics
Gymnasts at the 1906 Intercalated Games
Gymnasts at the 1908 Summer Olympics
Sportspeople from Skien